Leopold Kohl (21 March 1930 – July 2010) was an Austrian Nordic combined skier who competed in the 1952, 1956, and 1964 Winter Olympics. His best finish occurred at Cortina d'Ampezzo in 1956 where Kohl finished 17th in the Nordic combined event. Kohl also competed in cross-country skiing, finishing 51st in the 18 km event at Oslo in 1952.

References

External links
18 km Olympic cross country results: 1948-52
Olympic nordic combined results: 1948-64
Leopold Kohl's profile at Sports Reference.com

1930 births
2010 deaths
Austrian male cross-country skiers
Austrian male Nordic combined skiers
Cross-country skiers at the 1952 Winter Olympics
Nordic combined skiers at the 1952 Winter Olympics
Nordic combined skiers at the 1956 Winter Olympics
Nordic combined skiers at the 1964 Winter Olympics
Olympic cross-country skiers of Austria
Olympic Nordic combined skiers of Austria
20th-century Austrian people